The men's slopestyle competition of the 2018 Winter Olympics was held on 10 and 11 February 2018 at the Bogwang Phoenix Park in Pyeongchang, South Korea.

Summary
Due to a broken shoulder caused by a crash in training, Niek van der Velden was not able to compete. Then Norwegian snowboarder Mons Røisland, who was considered a possible medal contender, broke a chest bone and tore ligaments in a crash during practice prior to the finals, which made him unable to compete.

Eleven months after the Canadian Mark McMorris ended up in a coma, he won the Olympic bronze medal.

In the victory ceremony, the medals were presented by Pierre-Olivier Beckers-Vieujant, member of the International Olympic Committee accompanied by Dexter Paine, FIS vice president.

Schedule
All times are (UTC+9).

Qualification

The top 40 athletes in the Olympic quota allocation list qualified (for both big air and slopestyle, the rankings were combined). This meant only a maximum of 40 could qualify across both events. A maximum of four athletes per National Olympic Committee (NOC) was allowed. All athletes qualifying must also have placed in the top 30 of a FIS World Cup event or the FIS Freestyle Ski and Snowboarding World Championships 2017 during the qualification period (July 1, 2016 to January 21, 2018) and also have a minimum of 50 FIS points to compete. If the host country, South Korea, did not qualify, their chosen athlete would displace the last qualified athlete, granted all qualification criterion was met.

Results

Key
 Q — Qualified for the Final
 DNS — Did Not Start

Heat 1

Heat 2

Final
The final was started at 11:04.

References

Men's snowboarding at the 2018 Winter Olympics